Jack Howard Richardson (November 18, 1870 – June 12, 1960) was an American actor.

Background

Born in New York City, he was signed to a contract in silent films in 1911 by the American Company, working there for several years. Richardson appeared in more than 560 films before his death in Santa Barbara, California.

His credits are often confused with his contemporary John J. Richardson (AKA Jack Richardson).

Selected filmography

External links

1870 births
1957 deaths
American male film actors
American male silent film actors
Male actors from New York City
20th-century American male actors